Albert Hellen Gustaf Benedikt Lindgren (27 June 1857, in Hedemora – 9 February 1904, in Solna) was a Swedish author and translator. He was the son of author Amanda Kerfstedt.

Bibliography
Ryssland och nihilismen. [Stockholm]. 1883. Libris 2778754
Voltaire och hans strid mot fördomarna i religion och samhälle. Studentföreningen Verdandis småskrifter, 99-0470915-7 ; 14. Stockholm: Bonnier. 1889. Libris 1490511
Prosten Lars : svensk originalnovell. Stockholm: Nya Dagligt Allehanda. 1893. Libris 3077060
Sommarstudier i svensk poesi. Uppsala: Almqvist & Wicksell. 1895. Libris 3077108
Sveriges vittra storhetstid 1730-1850. Del 1-2. Stockholm. 1895-1896. Libris 363082
Emile Zola. Skrifter utgifna av Ord och Bild, 99-3235412-0 ; 6. Stockholm: Wahlström & Widstrand. 1898. Libris 1645477
Sagoskalden Hans Christian Andersen. Studentföreningen Verdandis småskrifter, 99-0470915-7 ; 86. Stockholm: Alb. Bonnier. 1900. Libris 1664055
Skalder och tänkare : litterära essayer. Stockholm: Gernandt. 1900. Libris 367443
Henrik Ibsen : i hans lifskamp och hans verk. Stockholm: Wahlström & Widstrand. 1903. Libris 477772
Johan Ludvig Runeberg : ett skaldeporträtt. Stockholm: Ljus. 1904. Libris 367791
Några diktareporträtt : essayer. Stockholm: Ljus. 1907. Libris 239958

References

1857 births
1904 deaths
Swedish writers